The 2017 SCO summit  was the 17th annual summit of heads of state of the Shanghai Cooperation Organisation held between 7 - 10 June in Astana, Kazakhstan. The upgrading of the membership of India and Pakistan to full members was one of the major topics, beside from security related topics, the Belt and Road Initiative and economic cooperation.

Background
On 21 April 2017 the foreign ministers met in Astana to prepare the meeting. The summit was planned to be before the opening of the Expo 2017, which also takes place in Astana.

India and Pakistan acceptance

The acceptance of India and Pakistan to the Shanghai Cooperation Organization was the first since 2001. This makes the SCO the largest and most populous international regional cooperation organization.

Belt and Road initiative
The summit in Astana was the first state visit of China's President Xi Jinping after the Belt and Road Forum in Beijing. The linking of SCO to the initiative was a major concern of the Chinese government. With Pakistan on a strategic position of the New Silk Road, the summit was thought to have a positive effect on further developments.
Also the Belt and Road Initiative was also first proposed by President Xi in Kazakhstan in 2013.

Security issues and anti-terrorism
One of the major tasks of the SCO is the combat against terrorism, which is believed to be strengthened through the acceptance of the new members.

See also
 Belt and Road Initiative
 Expo 2017

References

2017 in Kazakhstan
21st-century diplomatic conferences (Asia-Pacific)
Diplomatic conferences in Kazakhstan
History of Astana
Shanghai Cooperation Organisation summits
June 2017 events in Kazakhstan